Sawbridgeworth railway station is on the West Anglia Main Line serving the town of Sawbridgeworth in Hertfordshire, England. Its three-letter station code is SAW.

The waiting room was added in 1960 by H.H. Powell of the British Railways Eastern Region Architect's Department with H.E. Green as the Project Architect. The ticket office was added in 1972 by S. Hardy with Project Architect P.H. Thomas.

The station and all trains serving it are operated by Greater Anglia. Both platforms were extended to accommodate 12-coach trains in 2011.

The station adjoins Lower Sheering in neighbouring Essex, and part of the station was previously in Essex.

Services

All services at Sawbridgeworth are operated by Greater Anglia using  EMUs.

The typical off-peak service in trains per hour is:
 1 tph to London Liverpool Street
 2 tph to 
 2 tph to 
 1 tph to 

On Sundays, the station is served by a half-hourly service between London Liverpool Street and Cambridge North.

Level Crossing
The level crossing located to the south of the station is manually operated, like the signals at Liverpool Street Panel (L).

References

External links

Railway stations in Hertfordshire
DfT Category E stations
Former Great Eastern Railway stations
Greater Anglia franchise railway stations
Railway stations in Great Britain opened in 1842